The first lady (or first gentleman) of the State of Nevada is the honorary position of the spouse of the governor of Nevada. The first lady serves as the official host of the Nevada Governor's Mansion. To date there have been no female governors of the State of Nevada, and all first spouses have been first ladies. In cases where the governor has been a widower or unmarried, a daughter or mother has filled the role of official host.

List

Territorial first ladies

First ladies since statehood

Notes